Cervavitus is a genus of prehistoric deer that lived from the late Miocene (Vallesian age) to the Early Pleistocene (Villafranchian age) in parts of Western and Eastern Europe, Central Asia and China.

Description 
It is characterized by having thorny antlers finished in two or three points, brachyodont teeth, molars with a primitive fold (known as the "Palaeomeryx''' fold") and complete lateral metacarpals on their feet, which would serve to move through slope areas.
 Taxonomy 
Due to its particular position in the systematics and phylogeny of deer, is considered to form part of the first branches of cervids more advanced than the muntiacines, and perhaps is closely related to the branch that would give rise to the modern genus Cervus, although it has traditionally been classified as part of a separate subfamily called Pliocervinae.

 Evolution Cervavitus probably evolved in forested areas of Eastern Europe and then disperse during the Miocene to Western Europe and East Asia, taking advantage of the moist forests of Eurasia at the time, but the progressive aridity of parts of Asia and Europe since the Pliocene and the beginning of the Pleistocene, as a result of changes like the elevation of the Himalayas, forced these deer to take refuge in southern China, where they evolved or were replaced by the modern deer genera Rusa and Axis.

 References 

Khomenko, J., 1913: La faune méotique du Village Taraklia du district de Bendery. Annuaire géologique et minéralogique de la Russie, 15: 107–143.
Zdansky, O. (1925). Fossile Hirsche Chinas. Palaeontologica Sinica, C, 2: 1-94.
Teilhard de Chardin, P. & Trassaert, M. (1937). Pliocene Camelidae, Giraffidae and Cervidae of S.E. Shansi. Palaeontologica Sinica, n. ser. C, 102: 1-56.
Vislobokova, I.A. (1990). The Fossil Deer of Eurasia. Sciences Press, Moscow, 208 pp
Vislobokova, I.A. (2007). New data on late Miocene mammals of Kohfidisch, Austria. Paleontological Journal, 41: 451–460. doi:10.1134/S0031030107040119
Petronio, C.; Krakhmalnaya, T.; Bellucci, L. & Di Stefano G. (2007). Remarks on some Eurasian Pliocervines: Characteristics, evolution, and relationships with the tribe Cervini. Geobios'', 40: 113–130. doi:10.1016/j.geobios.2006.01.002

External links 
Cervavitus on Palaeobiology Database

Prehistoric deer
Miocene even-toed ungulates
Pliocene even-toed ungulates
Prehistoric even-toed ungulate genera